Meoncross School is a for-profit, mixed private school located in the village of Stubbington, near Fareham in Hampshire, England.

History
Meoncross School was opened by a Mr Watson as a boys' preparatory school in 1953. In 1964, now with Mr Meredith as principal it relocated to Catisfield House. In 1969, the school opened a girls’ department in Burnt House Lane in the village of Stubbington, near Fareham. This larger property became the home of the entire school in 1983 and extended to pupils up to 16 years old. In 1991 it added a Nursery. Meoncross is now a fully co-educational school.

In 1991, Meoncross joined the Asquith Court Schools group, a private company founded by entrepreneur David Soskin (with membership of the Independent Schools Association). In 2004, the preparatory schools owned by the Asquith Court group were purchased by the Cognita Group. Cognita posts losses annually, though it is unclear whether Meoncross School was part of the group turns a profit.

In 2013, Meoncross celebrated its Diamond Jubilee.

The school opened a sixth form in September 2015, expanding the age range of pupils to 18. There are 19 A-level subjects offered at sixth form. The sixth form was later closed sometime in 2017.

Today
Meoncross consists of a nursery, a Lower School from Reception to Year 6 and an Upper School from Year 7 to Year 11, under the leadership of the headmistress, Bev Watts, since September 2021.

References

External links
 Meoncross School website

Borough of Fareham
Educational institutions established in 1953
Private schools in Hampshire
1953 establishments in England
Cognita